Dravlje is a former village in the City Municipality of Ljubljana, the capital of Slovenia.

Geography
Dravlje is an elongated settlement at a transition from gravelly to clay soil that also corresponded to a border between cultivated fields (to the east) and meadows (to the south and west). The older houses extend to Zgornja Šiška. The former fields extended to the railroad to Upper Carniola but were mostly developed with new construction after the Second World War. Today's streets in the neighborhood correspond to the old farm roads between the fields.

Name
Dravlje was attested in written sources in 1136–68 as Draulach (and as Dreolach in 1330 and Draewlach in 1358). The name is based on the demonym Dravľane 'people from the Drava Valley', derived from the name of the Drava River. The name presumably refers to internal colonization of Slovenia before the 13th century, when people from the Drava Valley moved to the area. In the past the German name was Draule.

History
Dravlje was annexed by the City of Ljubljana in 1953, ending its existence as an independent settlement.

Church

A Baroque church dedicated to Saint Roch stands at the north end of the former village. It was formerly a popular pilgrimage destination. The church was built starting in 1646 (but not completed until 1682) in thanksgiving for the end of a plague epidemic that lasted several years. From 1956 to 1991, the south wall of the church contained four statues of saints that were invoked against the plague (Saint Roch, Saint Urban, Saint Sebastian, and the Virgin Mary). They are the work of Matej Tomec (1814–1885) and were removed from the chapel-shrine on Klagenfurt Street when it was destroyed in 1956. The shrine, which dated from 1645 and had been renovated in 1874, was rebuilt after the collapse of communism in 1991 and the statues were returned to it. There is a linden-lined boulevard leading to the cemetery next to the church.

References

External links
Dravlje on Geopedia